This is a list of songs released, recorded, performed or written by Saint Etienne.

External links 
 Saint etienne discography site
 Discogs entry on Saint Etienne

Saint Etienne